Rebenok is a Russian surname. Notable people with this surname include:

 Aleksandra Rebenok (born 1980), Russian actress
 Pavlo Rebenok (born 1985), Ukrainian football player
 Pavels Rebenoks (1980 - 2020) Latvian sworn advocate and politician of Russian descent

 Tretiy Rebenok, character in Metal Gear